Lazzaro Pasini (1861–1949) was an Italian painter, mainly of landscapes, but also some genre works.

Biography
A pupil of engraver Romualdo Belloli in Reggio Emilia, the city of his birth, Lazzaro Pasini moved to Florence after obtaining a scholarship to study at the Academy. He frequented Giovanni Fattori’s studio and, attracted by macchia style of painting, he devoted himself to executing landscapes of the Tuscan countryside from life. In 1884, he made his debut at the National Exposition of Turin with a genre scene based on a social theme. Similar themes became a constant feature of his work following his move to Milan in 1886, where he came into contact with exponents of Lombard Naturalism. At the beginning of the 20th century he became interested in the technique of separating colors to achieve effects of heightened luminism in works of a religious nature and in his first Lombard views, which won him the gold medal from the Ministry of Education in 1918. His mature works were devoted mainly to landscape painting, with a return to a late 19th-century naturalistic language. He died in Milan in 1949.

References
 Elena Lissoni, Lazzaro Pasini, online catalogue Artgate by Fondazione Cariplo, 2010, CC BY-SA (source for the first revision of this article).

Other projects

19th-century Italian painters
Italian male painters
20th-century Italian painters
Italian landscape painters
People from Reggio Emilia
1861 births
1949 deaths
19th-century Italian male artists
20th-century Italian male artists